Kofi Yeboah Schulz (born 21 July 1989) is a German professional footballer who plays as a left-back for Austrian Football Bundesliga club WSG Tirol.

Early life 
Kofi Yeboah Schulz was born in Berlin, Germany. He has one older brother, Kwame Schulz (b. 1987) and one younger brother, Kwabenaboys Schulz (b. 1998), who also plays football for Regionalliga Nordost club FC Viktoria 1889 Berlin. Born in Germany, Schulz is of Ghanaian descent.

Career
Schulz began his career in Rapide Wedding's youth team. In Sommer 1999 he moved to Hertha BSC's youth team. In June 2004 he signed for Milton Keynes Dons and stayed there for four seasons before signing for AFC Kempston Rovers.

On 16 July 2011, he left England and moved back to Germany, where he signed a two-year contract with 3. Liga club SV Babelsberg 03. After the season 2012–13 he left Babelsberg.

He signed for Regionalliga West club KFC Uerdingen 05 in January 2004. After a successful league campaign, he signed for Swiss Challenge League club FC Biel-Bienne in Switzerland. Schulz became widely known for his pace and gained national attention for is mesmerising solo-assist against FC Aarau. He signed for Super League club FC St. Gallen 1879 in January 2016 but remained at FC Biel-Bienne until the end of the season. In October 2017 he signed for Swiss Challenge League club FC Winterthur.

After four goals and three assists in the Swiss Challenge League, he signed for Greek Super League club Apollon Smyrnis. in August 2019 he signed for Austrian Football Second League club SKU Amstetten. He left the club on 6 February 2020, when he signed with SKN St. Pölten until the end of the season.

On 14 December 2021, Schulz signed with WSG Tirol.

References

External links
 
 

Living people
1989 births
Footballers from Berlin
German footballers
German sportspeople of Ghanaian descent
Association football fullbacks
3. Liga players
Regionalliga players
Swiss Challenge League players
Swiss Super League players
2. Liga (Austria) players
Austrian Football Bundesliga players
Kempston Rovers F.C. players
SV Babelsberg 03 players
KFC Uerdingen 05 players
FC Biel-Bienne players
FC St. Gallen players
FC Winterthur players
Apollon Smyrnis F.C. players
SKU Amstetten players
SKN St. Pölten players
WSG Tirol players
German expatriate footballers
German expatriate sportspeople in England
Expatriate footballers in England
German expatriate sportspeople in Switzerland
Expatriate footballers in Switzerland
German expatriate sportspeople in Greece
Expatriate footballers in Greece
German expatriate sportspeople in Austria
Expatriate footballers in Austria